Giles Greenwood is a male former weightlifting competitor for England and current weightlifting coach.

Weightlifting career
At the 2002 Commonwealth Games in Manchester he won a gold medal in the 105+ kg snatch, a silver in the combined and a bronze in the clean and jerk. Previously he had competed at both the 1994 Commonwealth Games for England and the 1998 Commonwealth Games in Kuala Lumpur for England where he won a silver medal in the snatch and a bronze medal in the combined.

Major results

* By 2002, medals were awarded in all three categories.

References

http://news.bbc.co.uk/sport3/commonwealthgames2002/hi/other_sports/weightlifting/newsid_2170000/2170139.stm

1971 births
Living people
English male weightlifters
Commonwealth Games gold medallists for England
Weightlifters at the 1994 Commonwealth Games
Weightlifters at the 1998 Commonwealth Games
Weightlifters at the 2002 Commonwealth Games
Commonwealth Games silver medallists for England
Commonwealth Games bronze medallists for England
Commonwealth Games medallists in weightlifting
20th-century English people
21st-century English people
Medallists at the 1998 Commonwealth Games
Medallists at the 2002 Commonwealth Games